Through My Eyes (also known as Through My Eyes: The Lindy Chamberlain Story) is a two-part Australian television crime drama, written by Tony Cavanaugh and Simone North, that is based upon the memoirs of Lindy Chamberlain-Creighton, whose nine-week-old baby Azaria was taken by a dingo from her family's tent near Uluru in Australia's remote Northern Territory. Directed by Di Drew, the miniseries broadcast on the Seven Network at 8:30 pm on 23 and 24 October 2004. A broadcast in New Zealand followed in August 2005.

To date, the series has yet to be broadcast outside of Australia and New Zealand, although is available to view on YouTube worldwide via the Australian Movie Channel. The series was released on Region 4 DVD via Magna Pacific in 2005, before being reissued on 7 July 2010. Both titles are now out of print.

For her role as Lindy Chamberlain, Miranda Otto was awarded the Silver Logie Award for Outstanding Lead Actress in a Drama Series.

Production
Although not part of the actual filming, Lindy acted as one of nearly 300 consultants to the series' producers, and also visited the set twice to speak with members of the cast and crew.

Reception
A review of the first episode in The Age commented; "Director Di Drew, working from a script by producers Tony Cavanaugh and Simone North, keeps the emphasis firmly on drama rather than documentary, skilfully teasing out themes of media behaviour, religious intolerance and the palpable public disdain over Lindy's steely emotional response to the loss of her child. And there are powerhouse performances throughout. As Lindy, headliner Miranda Otto has clearly studied the contemptuous scowl Meryl Streep gave her in Evil Angels, while Craig McLachlan as Lindy's husband Michael frankly acquits himself better than his CV would lead you to expect."

A review in The Sydney Morning Herald added; "Five hours over two nights is a daunting prospect, especially when the Lindy Chamberlain story is so well documented, but there are plenty of surprises and it's a story that bears further scrutiny. Miranda Otto and Craig McLachlan are superb as the devout, naive Chamberlains, a couple hopelessly out of their depth. Otto perfectly captures Lindy's unemotive intensity, while McLachlan's physical transformation is eerie."

Cast
 Miranda Otto as Lindy Chamberlain
 Craig McLachlan as Michael Chamberlain 
 Peter O'Brien as Ian Barker Q.C. 
 Shaun Micallef as Jack Winneke Q.C. 
 Steven Vidler as Inspector Graeme Charlwood 
 Stephen Anderton as Ian Cawood
 Graeme Blundell as Rex Kuchel 
 Nadine Garner as Sally Lowe
 Chris Haywood as Des Sturgess Q.C. 
 Andrew McFarlane as John Phillips Q.C.
 Travis McMahon as Frank Morris
 Paul Mercurio as Max Cranwell 
 Rex Granites as Nipper Winmatti 
 Stephen Jenkins as Jim Metcalfe
 Veronica Neave as Phyllis Cranwell
 Barry Otto as Frank Cocks 
 John McArdle as McAulay

References

External links

2004 television films
2004 films
Australian television films
Films directed by Di Drew
2000s English-language films